Matías Tudela (born 6 October 1984) is a Spanish rugby union player. He represents Spain in rugby sevens and is their current captain. He was part of the team that defeated Samoa to earn the last spot for the 2016 Summer Olympics. Tudela is a member of Spain's national rugby sevens team for the 2016 Summer Olympics.

References

External links 
 

Spanish rugby union players
Living people
1984 births
Spain international rugby union players
Rugby sevens players at the 2016 Summer Olympics
Olympic rugby sevens players of Spain
Spain international rugby sevens players
Heriot's RC players
Sportspeople from Valencia
Spanish expatriate rugby union players
Spanish expatriate sportspeople in Scotland
Expatriate rugby union players in Scotland